Florida v. Jardines, 569 U.S. 1 (2013), was a United States Supreme Court case which resulted in the decision that police use of a trained detection dog to sniff for narcotics on the front porch of a private home is a "search" within the meaning of the Fourth Amendment to the United States Constitution, and therefore, without consent, requires both probable cause and a search warrant.

In 2006, police in Miami, Florida received an anonymous tip that a home was being used as a marijuana grow house. They led a drug-sniffing police dog to the front door of the home, and the dog alerted at the front door to the scent of contraband. A search warrant was issued, which led to the arrest of the homeowner.

Twenty-seven U.S. states and the Federal government, among others, had supported Florida's argument that this use of a police dog was an acceptable form of minimally invasive warrantless search.  In a 5–4 decision, the Court disagreed, despite three previous cases in which the Court had held that a dog sniff was not a search when deployed against luggage at an airport, against vehicles in a drug interdiction checkpoint, and against vehicles during routine traffic stops. The Court made clear by this ruling that it considers the deployment of a police dog at the front door of a private residence to be another matter altogether.

Background 
On November 3, 2006, an anonymous, unverified tip was given to the Miami-Dade Police Department through its "crime stoppers" tip-line, indicating that the residence of Joelis Jardines was being used as a marijuana grow house. About a month later, on December 6, 2006, two detectives and a drug-detection dog approached the residence, while other officers of the Miami-Dade Police Department established perimeter positions around the residence, with agents of the Drug Enforcement Administration (DEA) in stand-by positions as backup units.

As summarized by the written opinion of the Florida Third District Court of Appeal:

While the Miami-Dade narcotics detective was away from the scene in order to secure the search warrant, Federal DEA agents remained behind to maintain surveillance of Jardines' home.  The search warrant was secured about an hour later, and was executed by officers from both agencies. The defendant was apprehended by a DEA agent as he attempted to flee through the rear door of the residence.

Lower courts 
Initially, the trial court granted the defendant's motion to suppress evidence that was obtained from his home, citing the authority of State of Florida v. Rabb.  The State appealed that decision to suppress, and the Florida Third District Court of Appeal (DCA) reversed, while certifying a conflict with the earlier Rabb decision.  Summarizing their reasoning, the DCA stated:

The foundation for the principle that "a canine sniff is not a Fourth Amendment search" was derived from the Supreme Court's previous dog sniff cases, discussed below, and lies at the heart of the instant case and of several other similar cases.

Jardines sought review in the Florida Supreme Court, based on the Rabb conflict.  In a 5–2 decision rendered on April 14, 2011, Florida's Supreme Court sided with Jardines, saying:

The State filed a motion for rehearing, which the Florida Supreme Court denied on July 7, 2011.

Previous dog sniff cases 
In its written opinion, the Florida Supreme Court referenced and analyzed the only three dog sniff cases to have been heard by the U.S. Supreme Court to date.  In the first, United States v. Place (1983), that Court answered the question of whether police, based on reasonable suspicion, could temporarily seize a piece of luggage at an airport and then subject the luggage to a sniff test by a drug-detection dog.  After the defendant's behavior at an airport attracted suspicion, police seized his luggage and subjected it to a sniff test by a drug-detection dog while en route through another airport, and ultimately discovered cocaine inside.  The Supreme Court concluded that the seizure, which lasted ninety minutes, was an impermissibly long Terry stop, but with respect to the dog sniff, the Court said that:

Next, in City of Indianapolis v. Edmond (2000), the Supreme Court tackled the question of whether police could stop vehicles at a dragnet-style drug interdiction checkpoint and subject each vehicle to a sniff test around the vehicle's exterior by a drug-detection dog.  The Court ruled that the vehicle checkpoint itself was an impermissible seizure, but as to whether the dog sniff was a search, however, the Court again held that:

In the third case, Illinois v. Caballes (2005), the Supreme Court ruled that a minimally intrusive warrantless dog sniff of a vehicle was permissible at routine traffic stops. The Caballes Court said that:

This conclusion, which upheld the constitutionality of certain minimally intrusive warrantless searches, was based on the premise that:
 such a vehicle has already been legally seized, albeit only temporarily, during a traffic stop;
 police never entered the car;
 both the vehicle and the police were on public property when they performed the dog sniff;

Consistent with previous rulings, the Court again maintained that an individual has no reasonable expectation of privacy while on public property, and that a dog sniff, being sui generis, revealed only information about contraband which nobody has the right to possess.

Other relevant cases 
The Florida Supreme Court reviewed two additional U.S. Supreme Court cases related to the instant case, the first being United States v. Jacobsen (1984). In Jacobsen, the Supreme Court answered the question of whether police could temporarily seize and inspect a package without probable cause, because it had been damaged in transit and had white powder spilling from it.  Subjecting a small portion of the powder to a field test for cocaine, it tested positive.  Again, it was considered not to be a search under the Fourth Amendment:

The other related case was Kyllo v. United States (2001). In Kyllo, police had used a thermal imaging device from a public vantage point so as to monitor the radiation of heat from a person's home – enabling them to identify the tell-tale heat signature from the lights that were used in a home marijuana grow operation.  The Court held that this use of "advanced technology" to learn private details about the inside of a person's home without a warrant was unconstitutional.  The Court's decision on Caballes a few years later called into question certain aspects of Kyllo, but Justice Stevens distinguished Caballes from Kyllo in this passage:

Dog sniff at a private residence 
In its analysis of the above cases, the Florida Supreme Court drew a clear distinction with respect to a dog sniff test that was not conducted against a vehicle, but against a private residence:

In a separate concurrence, joined by two justices from the Florida Supreme Court, Judge Lewis went a step further:

U.S. Supreme Court

Questions presented 
On October 26, 2011, Florida petitioned the U.S. Supreme Court for a writ of certiorari, which was granted on January 6, 2012.  The petition included the following questions of law:
I.  Whether a dog sniff at the front door of a suspected grow house by a trained narcotics detection dog is a Fourth Amendment search requiring probable cause?
II.  Whether the officers' conduct during the investigation of the grow house, including remaining outside the house awaiting a search warrant is, itself, a Fourth Amendment search?

The Supreme Court granted certiorari, but with the scope limited only to Question I as presented in the petition.

Amicus curiae 
Briefs of amicus curiae were filed in support of the petitioner by:
 United States of America
 The States of Texas, Alabama, Alaska, Arizona, Arkansas, Colorado, Delaware, Hawaii, Idaho, Iowa, Kansas, Kentucky, Maine, Michigan, Nebraska, New Hampshire, New Mexico, Oregon, Pennsylvania, Rhode Island, South Dakota, Tennessee, Utah, Vermont, Virginia, Washington and Wisconsin
 National Police Canine Association and Police K-9 Magazine
 Wayne County, Michigan

Briefs in support of the respondent were filed by:
 Rutherford Institute
 Cato Institute
 Fourth Amendment Scholars (52 college law professors)
 National Association of Criminal Defense Lawyers, et al.

Arguments 
In each of the Supreme Court's prior dog sniff cases, the Court's core belief that a dog sniff is sui generis and is only capable of detecting contraband substances has been the basis for concluding that a dog sniff did not constitute a 'search' within the meaning of the Fourth Amendment.  This fundamental assumption has remained largely unchallenged in any of the aforementioned "dog sniff" cases.  One Amicus brief directly challenged this assumption, by pointing out that:

In their petitioner's brief, the State of Florida argues that the lower court improperly relied on Kyllo and erred in equating the dog sniff with a search, in that:
 there was no physical intrusion or entry into the residence, and police have the right to approach a home's front door to "knock and talk" with the owner;
 "While a drug-detection dog may smell many different odors emanating from a source, it will convey only one thing: whether illegal drugs are present. ... and [it] reveals no private facts in the process";
 a dog is not a "device", nor is it the rapidly "advancing technology" that concerned the Kyllo Court;
 "This Court has held repeatedly that a dog's sniff is not a Fourth Amendment search".

Oral argument was heard on October 31, 2012.  This case was heard on the same day as that of another "dog sniff" case, Florida v. Harris.  That case focused on  whether law enforcement's assertions that the dog is "trained" or "certified" is sufficient to establish probable cause for a search.  The decision in Harris was handed down over a month before that of Jardines.

Decision 
On March 26, 2013, by a 5-4 margin, the Supreme Court held that the government's use of trained police dogs to investigate the home and its immediate surroundings is a "search" within the meaning of the Fourth Amendment, thus affirming the Florida Supreme Court.

Justice Scalia wrote the majority opinion, joined by Justices Thomas, Ginsburg, Sotomayor and Kagan. Justice Kagan also filed a concurring opinion, joined by Justices Ginsburg and Sotomayor. Justice Alito wrote the dissenting opinion, joined by Chief Justice Roberts and Justices Kennedy and Breyer.

In this instance, the Court did not divide along "typical" liberal-conservative ideologies.  The conservative justices were evenly split, with Justices Scalia and Thomas joining three of the four liberal justices on the majority.  Likewise, liberal Justice Breyer and Justice Kennedy – often the "swing vote" on cases determined along strict ideological lines – joined the minority in dissent.

Majority opinion 

Justice Scalia's majority opinion, joined by Justices Kagan, Thomas, Ginsburg and Sotomayor, did not focus on the right to privacy, which is implicated by most modern-day Fourth Amendment cases. Rather, the decision hinged on the basis of a citizen's property rights. It followed the 2012 precedent from United States v. Jones, that when police physically intrude on persons, houses, papers, or effects for the purpose of obtaining information, "a 'search' within the original meaning of the Fourth Amendment" has "undoubtedly occurred." This conclusion is consistent with the Court's early Fourth Amendment jurisprudence, which until the latter half of the 20th century was tied to trespass under common law. At the Fourth Amendment's "very core", the Court said, stands "the right of a man to retreat into his own home and there be free from unreasonable governmental intrusion."

Scalia cited precedents as far back as 1765, from Entick v. Carrington, a case before England's Court of King's Bench, quoting, "[O]ur law holds the property of every man so sacred, that no man can set his foot upon his neighbour's close without his leave."  He went on to say:

The Court acknowledged that a doorbell or knocker is typically treated as an invitation, or license, to the public to approach the front door of the home to deliver mail, sell goods, solicit for charities, etc.  This license extends to the police, who have the right to try engaging a home's occupant in a "knock and talk" for the purpose of gathering evidence without a warrant.  However:

Scalia used the analogies of a "visitor exploring the front path with a metal detector", or allowing police to "peer into the house through binoculars with impunity" to illustrate such activities that are not implicitly licensed by the homeowner, which would constitute a trespass under common law. The Court concluded that bringing a police dog into the home's curtilage to perform a forensic exploration for incriminating evidence was therefore an unreasonable search, absent a warrant.

Having determined the unreasonableness of the search on the basis of property rights, the Court stated that it was unnecessary to address whether or not Jardines' right to privacy was also implicated.

Concurring opinion 

Justice Kagan, however, joined by Justices Ginsburg and Sotomayor, expanded upon the binoculars example to argue further that both property and privacy rights are equally implicated:

The controlling case supporting this position is Kyllo v. United States, the previously-discussed case involving the use of a thermal imaging device. Referring to the drug-detection dog as a "super-sensitive instrument", she argued that, "[a drug-detection dog is] to the poodle down the street as high-powered binoculars are to a piece of plain glass. Like the binoculars, a drug-detection dog is a specialized device for discovering objects not in plain view (or plain smell)."  It need not matter that the device is "animal, not mineral", crude or sophisticated, new technology or old, small or large.  Where the device is not "in general public use," and is used against a home, it unreasonably violates a person's "minimal expectation of privacy".

Dissenting opinion 

Dissenting, Justice Alito, joined by Chief Justice Roberts, Justice Kennedy and Justice Breyer, wrote that the majority's decision is "based on a putative rule of trespass law that is nowhere to be found in the annals of Anglo-American jurisprudence". Alito instead argued that under the traditional laws of trespassing, visitors (including police officers) also are not considered trespassing if they "approach the door, pause long enough to see if someone is home, and (if not expressly invited to stay longer), leave ... a visitor who adheres to these limitations is not necessarily required to ring the doorbell, knock on the door, or attempt to speak with an occupant." In addition, an officer attempting a "knock and talk" may also "gather evidence by means other than talking. The officer may observe items in plain view and smell odors coming from the house." Alito also stated that detection dogs have been used for centuries, citing a 1318 Scottish law mentioning its use, and then wrote, "If bringing a tracking dog to the front door of a home constituted a trespass, one would expect at least one case to have arisen during the past 800 years. But the Court has found none."

Alito also disagreed with the concurrence opinion that a detection dog was analogous to a thermal imaging device as per the Kyllo v. United States ruling. First, he argued that there should be no reasonable expectation of privacy if odors coming from the inside reach outside to areas where people may lawfully stand. Secondly, unlike a thermal imaging device, he stated that a dog, "is not a new form of 'technology' or a 'device'. And, as noted, the use of dogs' acute sense of smell in law enforcement dates back many centuries." Alito also noted that in the Kyllo case, police officers operated their thermal imaging device while on a public street, and if that same standard were applied to a dog, he feared that it would not be able to be used to detect, for example, "explosives, or for a violent fugitive or kidnapped child," outside from a public sidewalk as well.

See also 
 Detection dog
 Police dog
 Florida v. Harris, 
 Rodriguez v. United States, 
 United States v. Place, 
 City of Indianapolis v. Edmond, 
 Illinois v. Caballes, 
 Katz v. United States, 
 Kyllo v. United States, 
 United States v. Karo,

References

External links 

 U.S. Supreme Court, Docket # 11-564, Proceedings and Orders
 SCOTUSBlog page for Florida v. Jardines

United States Supreme Court cases
United States Fourth Amendment case law
United States privacy case law
Search and seizure case law
United States Supreme Court cases of the Roberts Court
United States controlled substances case law
2013 in United States case law
Detection dogs
Miami-Dade Police Department
Cannabis in Florida